Twin Falls is a waterfall in British Columbia, Canada. It is 590 feet high. It is found in Yoho National Park.

References

Waterfalls of British Columbia
Yoho National Park